This article lists the Ministers of State in the Duchy of Anhalt from 1863 to 1918 and Ministers-President of the Free State of Anhalt from 1918 to 1945.

Ministers of State of the Duchy of Anhalt
1863–1868: Carl Friedrich Ferdinand Sintenis
1868–1875: Karl August Alfred von Larisch
1875–1892: Anton von Krosigk
1892–1902: Kurt von Koseritz
1903–1909: Nikolaus Michael Louis Hans von Dallwitz
1910–1918: Ernst Laue
1918: Max Gutknecht

Ministers-President of the Free State of Anhalt
Political Party:

See also
List of Ministers-President of Saxony-Anhalt

External links
Worldstatesmen.org – Duchy of Anhalt and Free State of Anhalt

Ministers-President
Anhalt
Ministers-President of Anhalt